Külüg Sibir or Baghatur Khagan (r. 630) was a ruler of the Western Turkic Khaganate (empire) in the 7th century. He was probably Tardu's son and the governor of the northern provinces of the empire during the reigns of his nephews. (see Göktürk family tree)

Background
The Western Turkic Khaganate in present-day Turkestan was founded as the result of the partition of the main empire after the death of Tardu in 603. It was also called On Ok ("Ten arrows") referring to ten powerful tribes in the empire. Five tribes (so-called Dulo) to the northeast and five tribes to the southwest (so-called Nushibi) formed the two rival factions, the border line being Ili River.

Revolt
In 630, the Dulo clan of tribes together with the Karluks revolted against Tong Yabgu Khagan, the most successful ruler of the empire. Tong was supported by the rival Nushibi faction. Külüg Sibir murdered Tong (who was his nephew) and declared himself as the khagan with the support of the Dulo clan. According to S. G. Klyashtorny and T. I. Sultanov, he was trying to end the tension between the khagan and the vassal tribes. However the Nushibi faction didn't accept his title and supported Tong's son to throne. Although Külüg Sibir asked for Dulu support, next year he had to abdicate. He escaped to the Altay Mountains where he was killed by Nushibi partisans.

See also
 Organa

References

Göktürk khagans
Ashina house of the Turkic Empire
7th-century Turkic people
631 deaths
Year of birth unknown